Pervez Khan Khattak (born 1 January 1950) is a Pakistani politician and a member of PTI who served as the Defence Minister of Pakistan from 20 August 2018 until 10 April 2022. He had been a member of the National Assembly of Pakistan from August 2018 till January 2023. Prior to that, he served as the 22nd Chief Minister of Khyber Pakhtunkhwa from 2013 to 2018.

Khattak has reformist views on Pakistan's political system  and he prioritised accountability in his own government, increased education enrollment, instituted reforms in the police and security sector, anti-polio campaign  and plans infrastructure projects; such as improving the transportation network. He also planned to revive the local economy by helping to rebuild tourism in the area. While for the long term, he planned industrialisation of the economy and a reduction in red tape.

Early life and education
Pervez Khattak was born on 25 January 1950 in the village of Manki Sharif to government contractor Hastam Khan Khattak, who was considered among the leading builders in the pre-partition subcontinent. He belongs to the Khattak tribe of Pashtuns. Pervez Khattak received his early education at the Manki Sharif Primary School, and later at Pak-AIMS. He was also a political worker for PPP in the past.

Pervez Khattak married twice. He is a father to three sons and two daughters. His eldest son Ishaq Khattak, after completing his education, is managing the company that his grandfather had established before the creation of Pakistan. His son Ibrahim Khan Khattak is a member of the Provincial Assembly of Khyber Pakhtunkhwa and Ismail Khan Khattak is receiving education in United Kingdom. His cousin Nasrullah Khan Khattak was also Chief Minister of KP during Zulfikar Ali Bhutto's rule as the Prime Minister of Pakistan.

Political career
He started his political career in 1983 as a member of the district council. He has served as once the Irrigation Minister of Khyber Pakhtunkhwa in 1988 and twice as the Ministry of Industries and Production (Pakistan) in 1993 and 2010. Khattak relinquished his elected post as the Secretary-General of Pakistan Tehreek-e-Insaf on 25 September 2013 to Jahangir Tareen.

As Chief Minister, he faced serious issues like terrorism, extremism, economic downfall, social upheaval. But under his leadership, the province embarked upon many ambitious plans that include institutional development, elimination of corruption, energy production, reforming all sectors of the Government with a special focus on Health, Education, Local Government, and Law and order. A number of reforms were introduced in Police, Education, Health, Local Government, and Civil Work Departments.

During his tenure as Chief Minister, he remained committed to establishing good governance in the province through the promotion of transparency, accountability, devolution of power, improving service delivery, entrenching rule of law, empowering citizens with a special focus on women empowerment, strengthening of institutions, etc.

Chief Minister of Khyber Pakhtunkhwa

On 13 May 2013, Chairman PTI Imran Khan nominated Pervez Khattak as the Chief Minister of Khyber Pakhtunkhwa, the top post in the province where PTI as of 25 July 2018 has 94 out of 145 seats. In 2013, Khattak was elected CM with 4 votes, more than his nearest rival from JUI-F Maulana Lutfur Rehman who secured 3 votes. He led a coalition government with PTI as the leading party while Jamaat-e-Islami and Awami Jamhuri Ittehad Pakistan were also a part of it.

Implementation of the "Right to Information" bill in KPK.
Energy Generation.
De-politicization of police.
Online Crime's First Information Report (FIR) System.
People empowerment & developments.
Mobile Courts.
Rehabilitation of drug addicts and IDPs.
Law Enforcement Capability Enhancements.
Upgradation of Khyber Pakhtunkhwa electricity distribution system.
Working on Whistleblower law to be implemented in KPK.

Relations with the federal government
Straight away after assuming office Khattak declared that he will pursue a non-confrontational approach with then Federal Government which was controlled by Nawaz Sharif, he hoped this détente would create a more stable environment for the KPK government to produce results. However confrontation became inevitable with conflict over the direction of the Taliban situation and by October 2013 the provincial government became more independent and assertive from the federal government, threatening to close US Supply lines.

Security and terrorism policy
Khattak favored peace talks with the Taliban. During his tenure an anti-terrorism force was set-up. Khattak's government combated drug smugglers leading to the arrests of many in raids.

Judiciary
Khattak supported the judiciary of his province. The mobile court is used to dispense justice and mediate between disputes

Electricity policy
In 2012, Khattak gave a 10-year hydro electric plan which was implemented across the province. He also approved energy conservation plans. He also campaigned to prevent electricity theft in the province of KPK. Pervez Khattak's Government announced to build 350 numbers mini-micro hydel power projects for the small villages and later seeing the success of the project increased the numbers to 1000 mini-micro hydel projects. The electricity price was as less as PKR 2–5 per unit (US$0.02–0.05/kWh).

Healthcare
Aside from anti-polio campaigns, the Khattak administration introduced drives to increase breast cancer awareness. The Pervez Khattak led KP government also launched, the first of its kind public sector facility in the country, a social health insurance programme for the underprivileged of the province. Through these insurance cards, the disadvantaged will be able to receive medical assistance at both private and public hospitals across the province free of cost.

Security policy
During his reign, he took a hardline against drone strikes, viewing them as extending extremism and threatened to block NATO supply lines if drone strikes continued and if the Federal Government refused to prevent them. Following a drone strike on 2 November 2013, a day before peace talks were due to start with the Taliban, Khattak affirmed that he would indeed use his power to push for the blocking of NATO supply lines.

See also
Chief Ministership of Pervez Khattak

External links
Facebook Page of Perviaz Khattak

References

Living people
Khyber Pakhtunkhwa MPAs 2013–2018
Pakistan Tehreek-e-Insaf politicians
Pashtun people
Chief Ministers of Khyber Pakhtunkhwa
Aitchison College alumni
University of Peshawar alumni
People from Nowshera District
1950 births
Government Gordon College alumni
Pakistani MNAs 2018–2023